The following is a list of squads for each national team competing at the 2018 AFC Futsal Championship. The tournament took place during February 2018 in Taiwan (referred to as Chinese Taipei by the AFC). It was the 15th competition organised by the Asian Football Confederation (AFC) for the men's national teams of Asia.

Each team had to register a squad of 14 players, minimum two of whom had to be goalkeepers. The full squad listings are below.

Group A

Chinese Taipei
Chinese Taipei named their squad on 31 January 2018.

Head coach:  Adil Amarante

Vietnam
Head coach:  Miguel Rodrigo

Malaysia
Malaysia named their squad on 1 February 2018.

Head coach: Chiew Chun Yong

Bahrain
Head coach: Adel Marzooq

Group B

Uzbekistan
Uzbekistan named their squad on 29 January 2018.

Head coach: Bakhodir Akhmedov

Japan
Japan named their squad on 16 January 2018.

Head coach:  Bruno Garcia Formoso

Tajikistan
Tajikistan named their squad on 23 January 2018.

Head coach: Hussein Shodyev

South Korea
South Korea named their squad on 25 January 2018.

Head coach: Lee Sang-jin

Group C

Iran
Iran named their squad on 28 January 2018.

Head coach: Mohammad Nazemasharieh

Iraq
Iraq named their squad on 29 January 2018.

Head coach: Haitham Abbas Bawei

China PR
Head coach:  Sergio Gargelli

Myanmar

Head coach: Htay Myint

Group D

Thailand
Thailand named their squad on 29 January 2018.

Head coach:  Pulpis

Kyrgyzstan
Kyrgyzstan named their squad on 31 January 2018.

Head coach: Amirzhan Mukanov

Lebanon
Lebanon named their squad on 27 January 2018.

Head coach:  Shahab Sofalmanesh

Jordan
Jordan named their squad on 25 January 2018.

Head coach: Saleh Abu Jafer

References

squads
Futsal tournament squads